Rossella Gramola (born 3 August 1955) is a former Italian middle-distance runner who was 8th on 1500 m at the 1976 European Indoor Championships.

She is married to the Italian middle-distance runner Gianni Del Buono, and is the mother of the middle-distance runner Federica Del Buono.

Achievements

National titles
Gramola won a national championship at individual senior level.

Italian Athletics Indoor Championships
800 m: 1982

References

External links
 

1955 births
Living people
Italian female middle-distance runners
Italian athletics coaches
Sportspeople from Vicenza